Cian O'Connor (born 29 December 1983 in Glounthaune, County Cork, Ireland) is an Irish sportsperson. He plays hurling with his local club Erin's Own and was a member of the Cork senior inter-county team from 2004 until 2007.

Cian O'Connor was born in East County Cork 29 December 1983.  He has made six appearances for the Cork senior hurlers since making his debut in 2004.  He is best known as a substitute. However, he started for Cork against Limerick in 2006.  Since that game he has returned to the substitutes bench.  He has unnatural skill in either the half back line or the full back line. He is contributing well in all of his appearances so far. During his senior hurling career O'Connor has contributed to Cork's All-Ireland victories in 2004 and 2005.  He was taken out of the lineup prior to the 2007 quarterfinal match my Cork manager Gerald McCarthy. Prior to this he has won an All-Ireland Minor medal in 2001, as well as 2 Cork Senior Hurling Championship medal, 2 County Under-21 medals and 2 County Minor medals with Erin's Own.

References

1983 births
Living people
Erin's Own (Cork) hurlers
Cork inter-county hurlers